Kerkouane Archaeological Museum is an archaeological museum located in Kerkouane, Tunisia. It contains statuary, jewelry and ceramic art.

See also

African archaeology
Culture of Tunisia
List of museums in Tunisia

References

Museums with year of establishment missing
Archaeological museums in Tunisia